Ali Jemal (born 9 June 1990) is a Tunisian professional footballer who plays as a goalkeeper for Étoile Sportive du Sahel.

Career 
Jemal was formed in ES Tunis. In July 2015 he was loaned to US Ben Guerdane. In January 2016 he made his return to ES Tunis signing a three-and-a-half-year contract.

References 

1990 births
Living people
Tunisian footballers
Association football goalkeepers
2021 Africa Cup of Nations players
Tunisian Ligue Professionnelle 1 players
Espérance Sportive de Tunis players
US Ben Guerdane players
Stade Tunisien players
Étoile Sportive du Sahel players
Tunisia A' international footballers
2016 African Nations Championship players